The Cobblestone Corridor is an American television series created by Erik Bloomquist that premiered on Sunday, October 16, 2016, on CPTV. The series is produced by Mainframe Picturesand is based on the short of the same name.

Plot 
At Alfred Pierce Preparatory School, a group of intelligent and diverse student newspaper staffers investigate the institution's most exciting and forbidden mysteries as The Cobblestone Corridor explores the definitions of truth, progress, and tradition.

The series draws inspiration from an eclectic mix of films, television shows, and literature, including The Hardy Boys, House of Cards, Dead Poets Society, The Maltese Falcon, Hey Arnold!, Scream Queens, and Gossip Girl.

Cast

Series regulars 
Erik Bloomquist as Allan Archer
 Danielle Bonanno as Claire Robinson
 Michael Bakkensen as Mr. Brown
 Ehad Berisha as Tim Hunter
 Nick Moss as Brock Larson
 Camrus Johnson as Dex Murphy
 Amelia Dudley as Kate
 Taylor Turner as Lewis
 Bill Raymond as Dr. Carroll

Recurring

Production
The series is based on the two-time Emmy Award nominated short film of the same name. After premiering on May 4, 2015, in Hartford, Connecticut. The short is widely acclaimed by domestic and foreign media outlets. In addition to airing on CPTV, the original short has played at various film festivals, via Vimeo on Demand, and on ShortsTV.

Season 1 began production on December 19, 2015, and concluded on March 23, 2016. Principal photography took place primarily at University of Connecticut School of Law in Hartford, Connecticut and Ethel Walker School in Simsbury, Connecticut.

Episodes

Awards 
The series was awarded three New England Emmy Awards in 2017: Outstanding Director for Erik Bloomquist, Outstanding Writer for Bloomquist, and Outstanding Performer for Nick Moss. The series received six additional nominations, including: Outstanding Arts/Entertainment, Outstanding Promo, Outstanding Editor, and Outstanding Promo for Ehad Berisha, Erik Bloomquist, and Danielle Bonanno.

References

External links 
Facebook

2010s American comedy-drama television series
2010s American mystery television series